The domain name moe is a top-level domain (TLD) in the Domain Name System of the Internet. Its name comes from the Japanese slang word moe, indicating its intended purpose in the marketing of products or services deemed moe.

History
Interlink began developing the  top-level domain (TLD) in 2012. On November 13, 2013, ICANN and Interlink entered into a registry agreement under which Interlink operates the  TLD. Interlink sponsored a contest held between April 11 and May 6, 2014, to design the domain's logo. The general registration period began on July 22, 2014.

Accredited registrars
As of June 27, 2019.

References

External links

IANA  whois information
 whois

Computer-related introductions in 2013
Internet in Japan
Moe (slang)
Top-level domains